Oldham Mumps was a railway station, opened in 1847, which served the town of Oldham, Greater Manchester, England. At the time of closure, it was operated and managed by Northern Rail.

The station, and the Oldham Loop Line were closed in October 2009 for conversion into a Manchester Metrolink tram line, renamed as the Oldham and Rochdale Line (ORL) and the station was demolished in 2010. Between 2012, and 2014, a temporary tram stop operated on the site of the station, until this was closed and replaced by a permanent tram stop a short distance away.

The name of the station survives in the present Oldham Mumps tram stop which is located a short distance north of the former railway station, on the realigned track of the Oldham town centre tram line.

History

Railway station (1847–2009)
Oldham Mumps railway station opened on 1 November 1847 to serve the town of Oldham.

The name of the station is taken from its situation within the Mumps area of Oldham, which itself probably derived from the archaic word "mumper", slang for a beggar.

The first railway to reach Oldham was a branch line which opened in March 1842, constructed by the Manchester and Leeds Railway (M&LR). This line ran from a junction at Middleton, from the Manchester to Leeds line which had opened the previous year, to Oldham Werneth railway station: Oldham Werneth was located inconveniently at the edge of the town centre, so in 1847, the line was extended one mile to Oldham Mumps station. By this time the Manchester and Leeds Railway had become part of the Lancashire and Yorkshire Railway (LYR).

The line between Middleton and Oldham was steeply inclined and therefore difficult to work; until 1854 the line had been cable-worked. In 1873, the LYR obtained an act to build a more direct, and less steeply inclined line between Oldham and Manchester, running via Failsworth, and joining the Manchester-Leeds line at Thorpes Bridge Junction. This line was opened in May 1880, therefore completing what became known as the Oldham Loop Line. The original line from Middleton to Oldham closed in 1964.

In 1957, the main station building was rebuilt by British Railways. This building was later demolished in the 1990s, and the station facilities were concentrated on the main island platform, which was reached by an underpass. The station was reached across the dual-carriageway Oldham bypass, a difficult walk from the town centre.

The station closed due to the conversion of the line to Metrolink on 3 October 2009 and, by May 2010, had been completely demolished. The station canopy has been saved. It was bought by the East Lancashire Railway after a successful public fund-raising campaign.

Temporary tram stop (2012–14)

In June 2010, the Greater Manchester Passenger Transport Executive announced that as part of the conversion of the former Oldham loop, it would submit a planning application for a temporary Metrolink terminus at Oldham Mumps, close to the site of the former railway station. Services to the temporary terminus commenced on Wednesday 13 June 2012

The temporary tram stop was reached by crossing Oldham Way or could be accessed by the free Metroshuttle service, which linked the station with the town centre and bus station.

The "temporary" Oldham Mumps tram stop was used as an interim measure, while the new street running tram line through Oldham town centre was built, and was closed on 18 January 2014. Its closure allowed for a  stretch of track which had run through the station to be permanently abandoned.

Permanent tram stop

The permanent tram stop opened on 27 January 2014, along with the Oldham town centre tram line on the site of the former B&Q store and is also a bus interchange.

The site since closure

In 2014, Oldham council unveiled plans to redevelop the former station site and abandoned line, with a new retail and housing development called Prince's Gate.

References

Disused railway stations in the Metropolitan Borough of Oldham
Former Lancashire and Yorkshire Railway stations
History of the Metropolitan Borough of Oldham
Railway stations in Great Britain opened in 1847
Railway stations in Great Britain closed in 2009